Xavier Alexander Batista (born January 18, 1992) is a Dominican professional baseball outfielder for the Bravos de León of the Mexican League. He has played in Nippon Professional Baseball (NPB) for the Hiroshima Toyo Carp and in the Chinese Professional Baseball League (CPBL) for the Fubon Guardians.

Career

Chicago Cubs
On May 29, 2009, Batista signed his first professional contract with the Chicago Cubs organization when he was 17 year old. He made his professional debut with the DSL Cubs. In 2010, he played for the rookie ball AZL Cubs, batting .212/.263/.300 in 45 games. He played 2011 with the DSL Cubs, accumulating a .259/.371/.472 batting line with 10 home runs and 38 RBI. In 2012, Batista played for the Low-A Boise Hawks, slashing .198/.283/.335 with 4 home runs and 17 RBI in 51 games. Batista began 2013 with the AZL Cubs, but after batting .246/.373/.420 with 1 home run in 21 games, he was released on July 31, 2013.

Hiroshima Toyo Carp
Batista was out of baseball until the Hiroshima Toyo Carp signed him as a developmental player in March 2016, and he spent the season with their developmental squad. The Carp signed him to their top roster in June 2017, to a six-year contract worth $47,000 per year with a $100,000 signing bonus. He hit home runs in his first two at bats for the Carp, becoming the first foreign-born player to hit two home runs in his first NPB at bats. He finished the season batting .256/.336/.560 with 11 home runs and 26 RBI. In 2018, Batista slashed .242/.308/.546 with 25 home runs and 55 RBI in 99 games.

Batista played in 103 games for Hiroshima in 2019, batting .269/.350/.513 with 26 home runs and 64 RBI. The Carp deactivated Batista on August 17, 2019, after he tested positive for a banned substance. On March 2, 2020, it was announced that Batista's contract had been terminated by the Carp, and he became a free agent.

Sultanes de Monterrey
On May 5, 2021, Batista signed with the Sultanes de Monterrey of the Mexican League. In 13 games for the club, Batista batted .327/.339/.455 with 9 RBIs.

Bravos de León
On June 5, 2021, Batista was traded to the Bravos de León of the Mexican League, in exchange for OF Anthony Giansanti.

Fubon Guardians
On January 3, 2022, Batista signed with the Fubon Guardians of the Chinese Professional Baseball League. On April 25, Batista was demoted to the farm team after hitting .222/.286/.361 with a 33% strikeout percentage and 80 wRC+ in 42 plate appearances. He was released on July 2, 2022.  He finished his tenure with the Guardians playing in 18 games and hitting .157/.250/.255 with one home run and 9 RBI.

Bravos de León (second stint)
On February 16, 2023, Batista signed with the Bravos de León of the Mexican League.

References

External links

1992 births
Living people
Sportspeople from San Pedro de Macorís
Dominican Republic expatriate baseball players in Japan
Dominican Republic expatriate baseball players in Mexico
Dominican Republic expatriate baseball players in Taiwan
Nippon Professional Baseball outfielders
Dominican Summer League Cubs players
Arizona League Cubs players
Boise Hawks players
Leones del Escogido players
Hiroshima Toyo Carp players
Sultanes de Monterrey players
Bravos de León players
Fubon Guardians players